Masappady Mathupillai is a 1973 Indian Malayalam film, directed by A. N. Thampi and produced by C. K. Sherif. The film stars Jayabharathi, Sudheer, KPAC Lalitha, Adoor Bhasi, Bahadoor and Jose Prakash in the lead roles. The film had musical score by G. Devarajan.

Cast

Jayabharathi
KPAC Lalitha
Adoor Bhasi
Jose Prakash
Manavalan Joseph
Muthukulam Raghavan Pillai
Alummoodan
Bahadoor
Kaduvakulam Antony
Kaval Surendran
Khadeeja
Kunchan
Kuttyedathi Vilasini
Meena
Narayana Das
Nellikode Bhaskaran
Paravoor Bharathan
S. P. Pillai
Sudheer
Vincent

Soundtrack
The music was composed by G. Devarajan and the lyrics were written by Vayalar Ramavarma, Kilimanoor Ramakanthan and Yusufali Kechery.

References

External links
 

1973 films
1970s Malayalam-language films